The Medusa Touch is a 1978 British supernatural horror thriller film directed by Jack Gold. It stars Richard Burton, Lino Ventura, Lee Remick and Harry Andrews, and features Alan Badel, Derek Jacobi, Gordon Jackson, Jeremy Brett and Michael Hordern. The screenplay was by John Briley, based on the 1973 novel The Medusa Touch by Peter Van Greenaway.

Plot
Monsieur Brunel, a French detective on an exchange scheme in London, is assigned to investigate the apparent murder of novelist John Morlar. As they examine the crime scene, Brunel discovers the victim is still alive in spite of his severe head injuries and has him rushed to hospital.

With the help of Morlar's journals and Dr. Zonfeld, a psychiatrist Morlar was consulting, Brunel reconstructs Morlar's life. Seen in flashback, it is filled with seemingly inexplicable catastrophes and the sudden deaths of people he disliked or who grievously offended him. Morlar has become convinced that, consciously or unconsciously, he himself willed the things to happen. He had become even more convinced when a supposed psychic examined his hands, became greatly unsettled at what he foresaw, and refunded Morlar's fee. Dr. Zonfeld scoffs at this explanation, asking Morlar if he seriously believes in palmistry as a means of predicting the future.

As flashbacks continue, it becomes shown that Morlar has powerful psychokinetic abilities. Morlar's earlier legal career is seen to have halted in a courtroom defence speech that reveals his disgust at the world and offends the judge resulting in a lengthy imprisonment for his client. He inadvertently curses the judge, who soon after dies of a heart attack with a look of unaccountable terror. Later, he proves to Dr. Zonfeld that he is the instrument of disaster when, with her watching, he forces a jumbo airliner to crash into a London office tower, killing everyone on board.

Brunel eventually concludes that Zonfeld has attempted to kill Morlar in order to stop him causing more disasters, the most recent, at the time that he was attacked, involving American astronauts on a space mission to the moon that is being widely broadcast in the media. Failing to get him to stop, she had bashed in Morlar's skull with a blunt object and left him for dead. Brunel confronts her and she admits trying to kill Morlar. Brunel does not arrest her right away, partly because he is also becoming convinced of Morlar's telekinetic powers. Later, Brunel returns to Dr. Zonfeld's office, but he discovers she has committed suicide, having left a note apologizing to him for leaving such a mess to deal with. From his hospital bed Morlar manages to bring down a cathedral on the "unworthy heads" of a VIP congregation attending a fundraising event for the crumbling building's restoration. Brunel races to the hospital and tries to kill Morlar to end the destruction, just as Zonfeld had, but he, too, is unsuccessful. Morlar, who is inexplicably still alive, writes on a pad the name of his next target: Windscale nuclear power station. It will be Morlar's most destructive disaster yet.

Cast

In addition, Gordon Honeycombe, long-time newscaster on the ITN national news broadcast, appears as the  TV Newscaster on televisions being watched by various characters. During coverage of the space mission the voice of James Burke can briefly be heard, apparently in an audio recording from his coverage of the real Apollo 13 mission.

Themes
That Morlar is disgusted with the world is cited in Kim Newman's 1988 book Nightmare Movies, wherein Newman describes Morlar's dialogue as "incredibly misanthropic."

Production

Filming locations
Bristol Cathedral was used as the location for the fictional London place of worship, called Minster Cathedral in the film.

The St Mary's Church Towers near Reculver were used for the scene where young John and his parents are having a picnic whilst on holiday. John wills the car to move towards his parents, which causes them and the car to fall over the cliff. Herne Bay, also Kent, was used for the scene where a young John Morlar (Adam Bridges) stays with his parents and is out on the seafront. The hotel is now residential properties.

Cultural references
A sample from the film (Richard Burton's line "I will bring the whole edifice down on their unworthy heads") was used in the Manic Street Preachers' 1998 song "Ready for Drowning". The 2005 Manic Street Preachers song "Leviathan" includes the lyric "Baader Meinhof and Medusa Touch".

Footage from the film appears in the music video "The Madness Was Mine" by the artist Sailing Blind.

See also
 Patrick, a 1978 Australian horror film
 Patrick, a 2013 Australian remake of the 1978 film

References

External links
 
 
 
 
 
 

1978 films
1978 horror films
1970s psychological thriller films
1970s mystery films
1970s science fiction films
1970s science fiction horror films
British science fiction films
British science fiction horror films
British thriller films
French science fiction films
French science fiction horror films
French thriller films
English-language French films
Films based on British novels
Films based on mystery novels
Films about writers
Films based on horror novels
Police detective films
ITC Entertainment films
Films directed by Jack Gold
Films shot at Pinewood Studios
Warner Bros. films
Films about telekinesis
Films with screenplays by John Briley
1970s English-language films
1970s British films
1970s French films